Leonardo Kirche (born 4 January 1985) is a Brazilian tennis player playing on the ATP Challenger Tour. He has played one match for the Brazil Davis Cup team.

Challenger finals

Singles: 1 (0–1)

Doubles: 2 (1–1)

References

External links

1985 births
Living people
Brazilian male tennis players
Brazilian people of German descent
People from Santa Bárbara d'Oeste
Sportspeople from São Paulo (state)